James, Jim or Jimmy Farrell may refer to:
 James Farrell (priest) (1803–1869), Irish cleric, first Dean of Adelaide
 James A. Farrell (1863–1943), president of US Steel, 1911–1932
 James Augustine Farrell Jr. (1901–1966) his son, ship operator and owner
 James T. Farrell (1904–1979), American socialist novelist
 J. G. Farrell (James Gordon Farrell, 1935–1979), Anglo-Irish novelist
 James Farrell (television producer), British television executive
 Jimmy Farrell (James Leo Farrell, 1903–1979), Irish rugby player
 Jimmy Farrell (footballer) (1919–2007), Australian rules footballer
 J. P. Farrell (James Patrick Farrell, 1865–1921), Irish nationalist politician and Member of Parliament
 James Farrell (police officer) (c. 1830–?), New Zealand policeman
 W. James Farrell (born 1942), American businessman
 James Esmond Farrell (1909–1968), New Zealand diplomat
 Jimmy Farrell, fictional character in the play The Playboy of the Western World
 Jim Farrell (born 1960), American politician in the state of Minnesota